The 1976 Men's World Weightlifting Championships were held in Montreal, Quebec, Canada from July 18 to July 27, 1976. There were 173 men in action from 46 nations.

This tournament was a part of 1976 Summer Olympics but counted as World Weightlifting Championships too. Only total medals counted for Olympic Games while Snatch and Clean & Jerk medals counts for World Weightlifting Championships.

Medal summary

Medal table
Ranking by Big (Total result) medals 

Ranking by all medals: Big (Total result) and Small (Snatch and Clean & Jerk)

See also
 Weightlifting at the 1976 Summer Olympics

References
Results (Sport 123)
Weightlifting World Championships Seniors Statistics 

World Weightlifting Championships
World Weightlifting Championships
1976 in Canadian sports
International wrestling competitions hosted by Canada